Tribute to Masami Okui ~Buddy~ is a tribute album for Japanese singer Masami Okui. It was released on June 25, 2008.

Information
To commemorate 15th anniversary since Masami Okui's debut in 1993, various anime song artists sing cover version of her previous works.

Track listing
Trust
Performed by: Minami Kuribayashi
From 11th album God Speed

Performed by: Chihara Minori
From 3rd album Ma-KING

Performed by: Aki Misato
From 7th album Devotion
Introduction
Performed by: Masaaki Endoh
From 9th album ReBirth
Olive
Performed by: Yoko Ishida
From 10th album Dragonfly

Performed by: Suara
From 11th album Crossroad

Performed by: Tomoe Ohmi
From 12th album Evolution

Performed by: Haruko Momoi
From 4th album Do-Can

Performed by: Hironobu Kageyama
From 13th album Masami Life
Happy Place
Performed by: Chihiro Yonekura
From 11th album Crossroad

Sources
Official website: Makusonia

2008 albums
Masami Okui albums
Tribute albums